Christophe Moly (born 16 July 1982) is a French former professional rugby league footballer who played in the 2000s. He played for the Pia Donkeys and Carcassonne club in the French Rugby League Championship competition.

He was named in the France training squad for the 2008 Rugby League World Cup.

He was named in the France squad for the 2008 Rugby League World Cup.

Moly continued to represent France in the 2009 Four Nations tournament.

References

1982 births
Living people
AS Carcassonne players
Baroudeurs de Pia XIII players
France national rugby league team players
French rugby league players
People from Carcassonne
Rugby league utility players
Sportspeople from Aude